is a former Japanese football player.

Playing career
Onoue was born in Hiroshima Prefecture on July 15, 1976. After graduating from University of Tsukuba, he joined Japan Football League club Mito HollyHock in 1999. He played many matches as forward and scored 10 goals. The club was also promoted to J2 League from 2000. Although he played many matches in 2000, he could not score a goal and retired end of 2000 season.

Club statistics

References

External links

1976 births
Living people
University of Tsukuba alumni
Association football people from Hiroshima Prefecture
Japanese footballers
J2 League players
Japan Football League players
Mito HollyHock players
Association football forwards